Wiarumus, a.k.a. Mandi, is a Torricelli language of Papua New Guinea, spoken in a village of just under 500. Only those villagers born before ca. 1940 can speak it. It is spoken in Mandi village, Turubu Rural LLG, East Sepik Province.

External links 
 Paradisec has two open access collections that include Wiarumus language materials; the first is Don Laycock's (DL2), the second is William Foley's (WF3)

References

Marienberg languages
Languages of East Sepik Province
Endangered Papuan languages